SS Salzburg was a German transport ship that was torpedoed by the Soviet submarine M-118 and sank on 1 October 1942 east of Lake Shahany, Ukraine.

Construction 
Salzburg was constructed in 1921 at the De Groot & V. Vliet shipyard in Rotterdam, Netherlands. She was completed in 1921. She had 1 x 3-cyl. triple expansion engine driving a single screw propeller. The engine was rated at 241 nhp.

Sinking 
Salzburg was torpedoed east of Lake Shahany by the Soviet submarine M-118 on 1 October 1942 while she was carrying 2,200 Russian prisoners of war from Burghaz to Odessa. About 2,000 prisoners and 2 crew members went down with the ship and the M-118 was attacked and sunk that same day by two Romanian minesweepers.

Wreck 

References

World War II shipwrecks in the Black Sea
1921 ships
Ships sunk by Soviet submarines
World War II passenger ships of Germany
Maritime incidents in October 1942
Shipwrecks in the Black Sea